Shirley Simms is an American singer and songwriter known for her work as a member of indie pop band the Magnetic Fields. She has been singing on the band's albums since her first appearance on 2008's Distortion, with her and Stephin Merritt alternating between singing lead vocals throughout the album. Previously, she sang on several tracks on the Magnetic Fields' 1999 album 69 Love Songs. In addition to her vocal work with the Magnetic Fields, she also sometimes plays ukulele for them. In the late 1980s, before he started the Magnetic Fields, Merritt and Simms started the short-lived musical project Buffalo Rome; the group self-released a cassette during their existence. Also during the 1980s, she was also a member of the Boston-based band Lazy Susan, along with Claudia Gonson and Therese Bellino. As members of Lazy Susan, Simms and Gonson wrote the song "Plant White Roses", which was later included on Merritt's 2011 album Obscurities.

In a 1999 interview, Merritt described Simms as "the best living female vocalist other than Doris Day".

References

Living people
20th-century American women singers
21st-century American women singers
The Magnetic Fields members
American women pop singers
American women songwriters
Year of birth missing (living people)
20th-century American singers
21st-century American singers